The Temple of Marcus Aurelius was a temple in Rome dedicated to the deified Roman emperor Marcus Aurelius by his son Commodus.  The temple has no surviving archaeological remains, but was probably sited just to the west of the column of Marcus Aurelius, where now stands the Palazzo Wedekind on Piazza Colonna.  A porticus probably surrounded both the temple and the column.

See also
List of Ancient Roman temples

Bibliography
Petersen, Domaszewski and Calderini, Die Marcussäule auf piazza Colonna, Munich 1896
 - Column of Marcus Aurelius

Marcus Aurelius
Nerva–Antonine dynasty
Marcus Aurelius
Roman temples of the Imperial cult